Flysta is a part of the congregation Spånga in the westernmost parts of the Stockholm municipality, located just over 10 km from the centre of Stockholm. It is a part of the Spånga-Tensta borough. Despite its location in a predominantly residential suburban area, this community has much of what smaller villages used to have, e.g. a bakery, grocery shops, carpenters, hairdressers located along the main road - Spångavägen. This is a testimony to the fact that it used to be its own village, and a summer residence area at the beginning of the 1900s.

Etymology
"Fly" in the word "Flysta" could have originated from the Swedish "gungfly", which refers to the swampy conditions that existed in the marshes in the area during the Middle Ages.

History
The history of Flysta goes far back, with several archaeological remains from the early Bronze Age. A local hill, named "Flystaberget" contains a burial mound from this time. As the sea levels were almost 25 metres higher than those of today, Flysta was a coastal community. Much of what is known as Flysta today was once submerged. The inland lake Mälaren, a few kilometres from Flysta, is a remnant of this age. The habitable area increased significantly during the Iron Age, and what had once been the sea floor turned into fertile soil. The area was settled by farmers around  1000 AD. As Christianity was not that prominent in Scandinavia at this time, many of these farmers would bury their dead close to their farms. Several burial mounds can be still be seen in the area. The earliest documented evidence of a settlement in Flysta dates from 1375, when a farmer named Gunnar of "Flyastum" is mentioned. The oldest map of the area, from 1636, mentions "Flysta farm". This farm later expanded into four different farms, which by the end of the 18th century had grown into a small village.

Living in Flysta
Flysta is a residential area with an increasing number of young families moving in from the inner city of Stockholm. The area has become popular in recent years due to its proximity to the centre of Stockholm, the opportunity to buy old property for renovation, good child-care services, and the ongoing village spirit. The latter can be explained by the fact that there are still a few dwellers in this area whose houses have been passed down through the generations, and hence with historical significance.

There is, despite the effects of urban sprawl, a traditional village centre with a bakery, grocery store, a furniture store, a shoe-maker/laundry service, a hairdresser, two pizza houses, and a movie rental place all within the Flysta area.

Flysta is located below the landing flight path of Stockholm Bromma Airport. Aircraft are scheduled to fly over Flysta on a frequent basis, but it isn't considered to be a major disturbance by the local residents. Similar opinions were recorded about the nearby Spångavägen road.

Districts in Västerort